The 1988 European Promotion Cup for Men was the first edition of the European Promotion Cup for Men, today known as European Basketball Championship for Small Countries.

Teams

Results

Group stage
The eight teams were allocated in two groups of four teams each.

Group A

Group B

Knockout stage

5th–8th playoffs

Championship

Final standings

References
FIBA Archive

1988
Small Countries
International basketball competitions hosted by Malta
1988 in Maltese sport